Nikola Rondović (born 27 March 1991) is a Serbian professional basketball player who last played for Cambrai Basket of the French NM2.

Professional career 
A power forward, Rondović played for Crvena zvezda, Superfund, Teodo Tivat, Mornar, Crnokosa, ETHA Engomis, Tamiš, OKK Beograd, Ibar, and Zlatibor. 

In 2019, Rondović joined French team Gennevilliers BC of the French NM2. In 2020, he moved to Cambrai Basket of the same league.

National team career 
In July 2007, Rondović was a member of the Serbia U16 national team that won the gold medal at the FIBA Europe Under-16 Championship in Greece. Over eight tournament games, he averaged six points, 2.5 rebounds, and 0.8 assists per game. In July and August 2009, Rondović was a member of the Serbia U18 national team that won the gold medal at the FIBA Europe Under-18 Championship in France. Over nine tournament games, he averaged 6.3 points, 5.1 rebounds, and 1.9 assists per game. In July and August 2011, Rondović was a member of the Serbia U20 national team at the FIBA Europe Under-20 Championship in Bilbao, Spain. Over nine tournament games, he averaged 3.3 points and 1.9 rebounds per game.

References

External links
 Nikola Rondovic at eurobasket.com
 Nikola Rondovic at realgm.com
 Nikola Rondovic at proballers.com
 Nikola Rondovic at aba-liga.com
 Nikola Rondovic at euroleague.net

1991 births
Living people
ABA League players
Basketball League of Serbia players
KK Crnokosa players
KK Crvena zvezda players
KK Mornar Bar players
KK Superfund players
KK Tamiš players
KK Teodo Tivat players
KK Zlatibor players
Montenegrin expatriate basketball people in France
Montenegrin expatriate basketball people in Serbia
Montenegrin men's basketball players
OKK Beograd players
People from Bar, Montenegro
Power forwards (basketball)
Serbian expatriate basketball people in France
Serbian expatriate basketball people in Cyprus
Serbian expatriate basketball people in Montenegro
Serbian men's basketball players
Serbs of Montenegro